The Rockford Rampage was an American indoor soccer team based in Rockford, Illinois, United States. Founded in 2005 as the Rockford Thunder, the team originally played in the American Indoor Soccer League until 2008 then moved to the Major Indoor Soccer League from 2008 to 2010. They were revived to play in the Professional Arena Soccer League for the 2012–13 season but folded after the season ended.

The team played its home games at Victory Sports Complex. The team colors were black and green. Their head coach was Jeff Kraft, assisted by Armando Sanchez.

History
The Rampage were originally owned by Pro Soccer International, a group managed by Michael O'Flaherty and Oscar Albuquerque, a former member of the former National Professional Soccer League's Illinois Thunder and the 1980 Canadian Olympic qualifying team.

On October 7 and 8, 2006, try-outs were held for the then Rockford Thunder at the ISC. 24 players arrived from various soccer backgrounds. Some had played locally with the Rockford Raptors, but other players had played in various leagues including: Segunda división mexicana, Tercera División de México, Primera División Uruguaya, 2 Liga Polska, USL First Division, and Premier Development League (PDL).

On March 10, 2007, after defeating the Cincinnati Excite 5-4 with a late goal by Ante Cop, the Thunder secured a position in the AISL finals to face the Massachusetts Twisters.

On March 31, 2007, the Thunder traveled to West Springfield, Massachusetts for the AISL Championship. The Twisters claimed the championship winning 11-5.

On August 7, 2007, the AISL announced that the Thunder had changed their name to the Rampage. This is most likely due to the Texas Thunder of the National Pro Fastpitch moving to Rockford.

The Rampage finished the 2007/08 AISL regular season with a 12-1 record. They defeated the Massachusetts Twisters 18-5 in the AISL championship game at home on March 15, 2008.

On September 9, 2008, the Rampage announced they were joining the new National Indoor Soccer League for its inaugural season in 2008-09.  They finished with a 10-8 regular season record, qualified for the playoffs, defeated Monterrey in the playoff semifinals, but lost to Baltimore 13-10 in the NISL championship game.

On July 7, 2009, it was announced that the Rockford Rampage acquired the Chicago Magic youth soccer club and its nationally recognized Development Academy and structured them as a non-profit organization.

On August 21, 2012, the Rampage joined the Professional Arena Soccer League for the 2012-2013 season. The team folded after the season.

Players
As of January 13, 2013

Staff
  Saul Robles - President/Majority Owner
  Oscar Albuquerque - Minority Owner
  Jeff Kraft - Head Coach
  Armando Sanchez - Assistant Coach

Year-by-year

† Two seasons not recorded.

Head coaches

Arenas
 Victory Sports Complex 2007–2008; 2012–2013
 Rockford MetroCentre 2005–2007; 2008–2010

References

External links 
  

2005 establishments in Illinois
American Indoor Soccer League teams
Association football clubs established in 2005
Defunct indoor soccer clubs in the United States
Defunct Professional Arena Soccer League teams
Soccer clubs in Illinois
Indoor soccer clubs in the United States
Major Indoor Soccer League (2008–2014) teams
Rampage
2013 disestablishments in Illinois
Association football clubs disestablished in 2013